was an educator, translator, and novelist best known for translating Little Lord Fauntleroy written by Frances Hodgson Burnett. She is also known for introducing literature with Christianity for children's novels.

Early life 

Born to Katsujirō Matsukawa as the eldest daughter in Aizu (Aizuwakamatsu post 1868), named  according to the year on Chinese calendar when she was born. At the age of one in 1868, her father left his family as an espionage who served for Aizu clan against the revolutionist during Boshin war, and the next year, he was relocated to Tonami, the present day Mutsu with his feudal lord. Kashi, her mother and the newborn sister Miya endured poverty and adverse circumstances during that period in Aizu, while Kashi's mother died in 1870.

In Yokohama 
Ōkawa Jinbei, a wealthy merchant from Yokohama was visiting Aizu Wakamatsu and adopted Kashi as his daughter. In 1871 at the age of seven, Ōkawa Kashi was admitted to and studied at Isaac Ferris Seminary led by Mary E. Kidder-Miller, a missionary of Presbyterian Church in the United States of America (PCUSA) who founded the Seminary in 1875. It was in 1877 when Kashi was baptised at the Church of Christ in Japan by pastor Inagaki Makoto.

Kashi graduated from Isaac Ferris Seminary among the first alumnae in 1881 at the age of seventeen and was hired as a teacher for Japanese literature at her alma mater, which was by then called . She used a tentative family name Shimada instead of Ōkawa, a name thought to be after her natural father's espionage name. Her stepfather died in 1883, and in 1885 her natural father Matsukawa Katsujirō restored Kashi to his family register in Tokyo where he lived. She had been suffering from tuberculosis.

Kashi met Iwamoto Yoshiharu when he lectured at her school, and in 1886 he published two of her articles in his magazine Jogaku zasshi; a travelogue  in the 23rd issue, and in the 37th In Memoriam—Condolence Poem, a mourning poetry written in English dedicated to Yoshiharu's friend the late principal Kimura Tōko of Meiji Girls' School. Kashi had taken her pen name from her home town Wakamatsu, and Shizu or Shizuko meaning "the servant of God". Aside from Shizu and Shizuko, she used such names as Bōjo (literary Joan Doe) and Shizunojo at times.

She retired from Ferris and married Iwamoto Yoshiharu in 1889 at the church she was baptised in Yokohama. Yoshiharu was the editor in chief at Jogaku zasshi since 1886, as the co-founder and his friend Kondō Kumazō had passed away that year. Kashi started teaching English at Meiji Girls' School which had been founded in 1885, but Kimura Tōko, the first principal had died in 1886 to whom Kashi dedicated a poetry in English. The second principal pastor Kimura Kumaji was Tōko's husband, and as a good friend of Kimuras', Yoshiharu supported the administrative works at the school. Kumaji retired in 1892 and Yoshiharu succeeded as the third principal until he closed it in 1909. Kashi and Yoshiharu had two daughters and a son.

Novels and essays 
There are over 50 literature she published on Jogaku zasshi with the most popular translation of Little Lord Fauntleroy written by an American novelist Frances Hodgson Burnett. The translation,  was issued as a serial between 1890 and 1892 on Jogaku zasshi. As both Morita Shiken, a translator for Jules Verne's Two Years' Vacation, and a literature critique/Shakespeare translator Tsubouchi Shōyō praised that she had a style to her writing that unified colloquial and literature language. Her realistic description impressed not only them, but juvenile readers for generations enjoyed her works as much that it is in the 30th impression.

Starting in 1894 when she was 30, she edited those columns for women and children in a journal The Japan Evangelist and posted some 70 essays introducing Japanese books, annual events and customs in English.

Her health deteriorated while leading busy life between chores of a housewife and a writer suffered tuberculosis. A fire broke out at Meiji Girls' School in February 1896, and five days after that, Wakamatsu Shizuko passed away due to heart attack. She rests in Somei cemetery in Tokyo.

Notable works

Magazine submissions 
 Jogaku zasshi and Hyōron

For magazines, Wakamatsu Shizuko (Shizu) submitted her writings and translation mainly on either Jogaku zasshi or Hyōron. Both magazines were published by Jogaku Zasshisha in Tokyo.

 Written in English.

 A serial completed in 1893.

 Inspired by Harriet Beecher Stowe.

 Japan Evangelist and Shōnen Sekai 

 Wakamatsu Shizuko's last writing.

Translation 
 Adopted from Adelaide Anne Proctor's poetry.

 Translated from part of Charles Dickens' David Copperfield.

 A serial run through 1894.
 Also titled as  [].

Reprints 
Articles and titles reprinted in recent years.

 In Iwanami Bunko, 30th impression.

Anthology

Further reading

Biography 
, appendix.

Bibliography

Notes

References

External links 
 福島県立図書館 若松賤子 Fukushima Prefectural Library (Japanese)
 福島県男女共生センター 若松賤子 Fukushima Prefectural Center for Equal Rights (Japanese)
 青空文庫 若松賤子 Aozora bunko project (Japanese)

1864 births
1896 deaths
Aizu-Matsudaira retainers
Japanese children's writers
Japanese women children's writers
19th-century Japanese women writers
Japanese educators
Japanese translators
People from Fukushima Prefecture
Writers from Fukushima Prefecture
Japanese women educators
19th-century Japanese translators
Ferris University alumni